Kidatu is a town in central Tanzania, located in Kilombero District, Morogoro Region.  The local population is about 3,300. The primary economic activity is the large Illovo sugar cane plantation and factory which produces  of sugar per year.

Geography
It lies on plains to the south of mountains to the north.

Transport 
Kidatu is the terminus of a   narrow gauge branch line from Kilosa off the Tanzania Railways Corporation Central line, built between 1958 and 1963..  In the 1970s, the newer  TAZARA railway was built through.

Transshipment hub 

Since 1998, a transshipment station has been provided to overcome the break-of-gauge at this location. This hub connects the large  zone of southern Africa and bypasses congestion at Dar es Salaam.

Under a deal with Tanzania, metre gauge trains that connect with  trains at Kidatu are operated by the Trans Africa Railway Corporation.

Approximately  of traffic passes through the hub each year.

Industry 

Kidatu has a sugar mill.

See also 
 Kidatu Dam
 Transport in Tanzania
 East African Railway Master Plan
 Cape-Cairo railway
 Railway stations in Tanzania

References

External links 
 Rail in East Africa
 Freedom railway 
 Dar

Populated places in Morogoro Region